Salvia serotina (Littlewoman) is a herbaceous annual that is native to Florida, Bermuda, the West Indies, and Mexico south through Panama, growing on moist ground and as a weed in cultivated fields. The flowers are blue and white.

Notes

serotina